Deh Now-e Lakzi (also Romanized as Deh Now-e Lakzī; also known as Deh Now-ye Lagzī, Deh-i-Nau, Dehnow, Deh Now-e Lagzī, and Dehnow-e Lagzī) is a village in Darbqazi Rural District, in the Central District of Nishapur County, Razavi Khorasan Province, Iran. At the 2006 census, its population was 184, in 49 families.

References 

Populated places in Nishapur County